SP47 was a code name for a Polish diesel locomotive, designed for passenger transport. It never reached serial production.

History
SP47 was supposed to be an export hit of the Cegielski Works. Unfortunately, due to political decisions only two prototypes of this locomotive were ever built. SP47 was the most modern Polish locomotive in those times, and one of the most modern in Europe.

Prototypes
The design of the locomotive, later code-named SP47, was drawn up in 1972. In 1974 construction started at the Cegielski workshop in Poznań, but, on finishing the first one, the decision was taken to terminate diesel locomotives production in Poland. The reason for this was the danger that Polish locomotives would compete with the Soviet ones; in fact SP47 was by far better than any Soviet locomotive.

The second prototype (following a great struggle) was completed in 1977.

Career
Both locomotives were dispatched to Olsztyn, where they worked until their end. The second prototype suffered a serious engine failure a few months after entering service. As a result, in 1991 it was set aside, and in 1998 taken out of service and scrapped in 2001.
The first of two prototypes run until a serious engine failure in 1997.

SP47-001 is currently (after exterior renovation) exhibited at the Railway Museum in Kościerzyna heritage park.

See also
Polish locomotives designation

Co′Co′ locomotives
Diesel-electric locomotives of Poland
Railway locomotives introduced in 1975
Standard gauge locomotives of Poland